Oriental Lodge No. 500, known today as Prince Hall Masonic Temple, is a historic building located in Indianapolis, Indiana, United States.  It was designed by Rubush & Hunter and others and completed in 1916. It is a four-story, rectangular, steel frame and reinforced concrete structure with brick exterior walls.  It has terra cotta decorative elements that are interpretations of Islamic architecture of the Middle East, North Africa, and Spain.

It was listed on the National Register of Historic Places in 2016.

References

Clubhouses on the National Register of Historic Places in Indiana
Buildings and structures completed in 1916
Buildings and structures in Indianapolis
National Register of Historic Places in Indianapolis